Andrés Aguado de Valdés, O.S.A. (1592–1645) was a Roman Catholic prelate who served as Bishop of Ariano (1642–1645).

Biography
Andrés Aguado de Valdés was born in 1592 in Valladolid, Spain and ordained a priest in the Order of Saint Augustine.
On 26 May 1642, he was appointed during the papacy of Pope Urban VIII as Bishop of Ariano.
On 1 Jun 1642, he was consecrated bishop by Pier Luigi Carafa (seniore), Bishop of Tricarico. 
He served as Bishop of Ariano until his death.

References

External links and additional sources
 (for Chronology of Bishops) 
 (for Chronology of Bishops) 

17th-century Italian Roman Catholic bishops
Bishops appointed by Pope Urban VIII
Bishops of Ariano
Augustinian bishops
People from Valladolid
1592 births
1645 deaths